Anushree and Anusree are feminine given names of Indian origin. This name originally means Beautiful and Beautiful/pleasant morning. People with those names include:

 Anushree (Kannada actress) (born 1988), Kannada actress and television anchor
 Anusree (born 1988), Malayalam actress born Anusree Nair
 Anusree Roy (born 1982), Indo-Canadian playwright, actress and librettist

See also
 
 

Indian feminine given names